Abdel Emir Rashid Yarallah  (born August 18, 1964) is an Iraqi general who currently serves as the Chief of the General Staff of the Iraqi Armed Forces, serving in the position since 8 June 2020.

References 

1964 births
Living people
Iraqi generals